John Murray (born 2 March 1948) is an English retired professional footballer who played as a winger in the Football League, most notably for Reading and Bury. He later served as youth team manager at Northampton Town.

Career statistics

Honours

As a player 
Reading
 Football League Fourth Division third-place promotion: 1975–76

As a manager 
Newbury Town
 Athenian League: 1982–83

References

External links 
 

1948 births
20th-century English people
21st-century English people
Association football wingers
Blackpool F.C. players
Burnley F.C. players
Brentford F.C. players
Bury F.C. players
English footballers
English football managers
English Football League players
Living people
Reading F.C. players
Footballers from Newcastle upon Tyne
Northampton Town F.C. non-playing staff